Smita Bakshi is an Indian politician from Kolkata, West Bengal, India.
She was the  M.L.A of West Bengal Legislative Assembly. representing the 165, Jorasanko (Vidhan Sabha constituency) two times (term 2011 & 2016). She was MLA of Jorasanko, Councillor of KMC Ward 25 & Chairperson of Borough IV, Working President of West Bengal Trinamool Mahila Congress.

Personal life

Assembly election 2016
In the 2016 elections, Smita Bakshi of All India Trinamool Congress defeated BJP candidate Rahul Sinha came second by a very small margin.

See also

 Mamata Banerjee
 Dr. Shashi Panja
 All India Trinamool Congress
 Jorasanko (Vidhan Sabha constituency)
 2016 West Bengal Legislative Assembly election

References

External links 
West Bengal Legislative Assembly

West Bengal MLAs 2011–2016
West Bengal MLAs 2016–2021
Trinamool Congress politicians from West Bengal
Living people
1951 births
Scottish Church College alumni
University of Calcutta alumni